Foundation Financial Group was a financial services company with regional operations centers in Atlanta, Fort Worth, Jacksonville, Raleigh, N.C., Rochester, New York and Savannah, Ga. as well as branch offices in Wichita, KS, St. Paul, MN, Indianapolis, IN, Greenwood, IN, Kansas City, MO, and Dayton, OH that holds mortgage lending licenses in 39+ states. In addition, Foundation Financial Group was a major employer in Atlanta and Jacksonville, Florida.  Foundation Financial Group has received several awards for its employment practices, community involvement, and has demonstrated growth since its original inception in 2004.

Services
Foundation Financial Group offers residential mortgage lending and refinancing, property and casualty insurance for home or auto, as well as life insurance, and retirement services in the United States.

Company history
Foundation Financial Group began with the corporate inception of a regional center in Atlanta, Georgia in 2004.  Later that year, it opened a second regional center in Jacksonville, Florida.  In the following years, from 2005 to 2011, Foundation Financial Group expanded to obtain licensing in 39+ states, and retail branch locations.

Foundation Financial Group funds more than $4 billion in loans. A mortgage industry-tracking source, www.mortgageStats.com states that Foundation Financial Group grew by 14 percent in 2011, in contrast to the downward trend of other lenders in the same period. Additionally, the mortgage industry-tracking source, mortgagestats.com reports that the top 10 U.S. mortgage lender originations are down almost 21 percent for the same period, while Foundation Financial Group revenue has increased 34.55% since 2009.

In 2012, Foundation Financial Group entered a partnership with the Susan G. Komen for the Cure, a national nonprofit that funds breast cancer research. For each 2011 tax return Foundation Financial Group prepared, the company made a donation to Komen for the Cure.

See also
Mortgage
Financial services
Refinancing

References

External links
  Inc 500/500 website
 Jacksonville Business Journal 28 October 2011

Financial services companies established in 2004
Mortgage lenders of the United States
Financial services companies of the United States